Golden Valley High School is a school in the William S. Hart Union High School District in the Canyon Country neighborhood of Santa Clarita, California, United States. The school first opened in 2004 with a new campus, admitting freshmen and sophomores; the first class graduated in 2007.

History
Golden Valley High School was built with grants from the state of California's Financial Hardship Assistance program. After initially sitting dormant after construction, the school's theater was finished around 2010.

Athletics
Golden Valley started its athletics program when the school first opened in 2004.

In 2011 the boys' cross country team succeeded in achieving their first state championship in CIF Division II. They also placed 11th at the Nike Cross Nationals in Portland, Oregon.

Organizations

Choir
The school has two competitive show choirs, the mixed-gender "Voltage" and the female-only "Vibes".

Video production
In 2019, the school's GVTV (Golden Valley Television) won Best Daily Live Announcement Show on the West Coast from Student Television Network.

Junior Reserve Officers' Training Corps
The school is host to the U. S. Air Force Junior Reserve Officers' Training Corps unit CA-20063.

Student demographics
As of the 2020-21 school year, 2,138 students were enrolled at Golden Valley High School. 60.1% of students were Hispanic, 16.4% were non-Hispanic white, 11.0% were Asian American, and 8.3% were African American. As of 2019-20, 1,058 students (49.3%) were eligible for free or reduced-price lunch.

Notable alumni
Maverick Ahanmisi, basketball player
 Blueface, rapper 
 Scott Barlow, baseball player
 Leon Jacobs, football player
 ppcocaine, rapper, singer, and songwriter 
 Nikkita Lyons, Actor and Wrestler

References

External links 
School website

High schools in Santa Clarita, California
Public high schools in California
2004 establishments in California
Educational institutions established in 2004